Waleran II may refer to:

 Waleran II of Limburg (c. 1085–1139)
 Waleran II of Luxembourg, Lord of Ligny (died 1354)